The Battle of Saint-Cast was a military engagement during the Seven Years' War on the French coast between British naval and land expeditionary forces and French coastal defence forces.  Fought on 11 September 1758, it was won by the French.

During the Seven Years' War, Britain mounted numerous amphibious expeditions against France and French possessions around the world. In 1758 a number of expeditions, then called descents, were made against the northern coast of France. The military objectives of the descents were to capture and destroy French ports, divert French land forces from Germany, and suppress privateers operating from the French coast. The battle of Saint-Cast was the final engagement of a descent in force that ended in a French victory.

Background
The expedition contained sizable naval and land forces. The naval forces were two squadrons consisting of: Admiral Anson's 22 ships of the line with 9 frigates crewed by 15,500 men and Commodore Howe's 1 ship of the line of 64 guns, 4 of 50 guns, 10 frigates, 5 sloops, 2 fire-ships, 2 bomb ketches, 6,000 sailors, 6,000 marines, 100 transports, 20 tenders, 10 store-ships and 10 cutters with crews totaling some 5,000 merchant seamen. The land forces were four infantry brigades consisting of: the Guards Brigade made up of the 1st battalions of the 1st, Coldstream and 3rd Foot Guards and three brigades made up of the 5th, 24th, 30th, 33rd, 34th, 36th, 38th, 67th, 68th and 72nd Regiments of Foot, as well as an artillery train of 60 cannon with 400 artillerymen and a few hundred Light Dragoon cavalry, totaling over 10,000 soldiers.

Britain's naval forces were under the command of Admiral Lord Anson, seconded by Commodore Howe. Britain's land forces were commanded by Lieutenant-General Thomas Bligh. Against this the French had numerous garrison troops and militia spread thinly over the northern coast of France that would have to be concentrated at whichever place the British landed.

Initially the expedition met with considerable success capturing the port of Cherbourg. The British destroyed the port, the docks and the ships harbored there, carrying off or destroying considerable war material and goods. French troops from various places began moving on Cherbourg and the British expedition re-embarked to move against Saint Malo on 5 September but it was found to be too well defended. The weather now turned against the British as well and it was decided it would be safer to re-embark the land forces further west in the bay of Saint Cast near the small village of Saint-Cast and the towns of Le Guildo and Matignon. The fleet sailed ahead while the army marched overland on 7 September, engaging in skirmishes on the 7th, 8th and 9th. On 10 September the Coldstream Guards were sent ahead to Saint Cast to collect provisions and convoy them back to the army. Lieutenant-General Bligh with the army camped at Matignon some 3 miles from Saint-Cast.

During this time Richelieu, duc d'Aiguillon, military commander of Brittany, had gathered some 12 regular line infantry battalions, including; Régiment Royal des Vaisseaux, Régiment Volontaires Étrangers, Régiment de Bourbon, Régiment de Bresse, Régiment de Quercy, Régiment de Penthièvre, Régiment de Marmande, from the garrison of Saint-Malo and a brigade of the Regiment de Fontenay-le-Comte, Régiment de Brie and Régiment de Boulonnais; six squadrons of  cavalry, some companies of coastal militia, and several artillery batteries. The French army amounting to 8,000 or 9,000 men, under the field command of Marquis d'Aubigné, was fast marching on Saint-Cast from Brest by way of the town of Lamballe and from the town of Dinan.

The battle
Bligh broke camp by 3:00 in the morning of the 11th and reached the beach at Saint-Cast before 9:00 but the embarcation went very slowly. The transports stood well off shore and the flat-bottomed landing boats used to carry some 70 men each were initially employed loading supplies, artillery, livestock and horses. Hardly any soldiers had embarked when the French appeared and began a cannonade of the beach.

Bligh had formed the 1st Foot Guards and the grenadier companies of the line regiments into a rear guard of about 1500 men under the command of the Guards Brigade commander, Major-General Dury, to cover the withdrawal of the army from behind some dunes along the beach. A great deal of confusion and panic set in among the British in the hurry to get off the beach. The French forces moved down a covered way to the beach and deployed three brigades into line with a fourth in reserve. The five frigates and the bomb ketches tried to cover the British embarkation and their fire disordered and drove back the French line for a while. The French artillery batteries were well positioned on higher ground commanding the beach and the bay. They exchanged shots with the ships of the fleet, and sank three landing boats full of soldiers; other landing boats were damaged on the beach. When the British troops remaining ashore were some 3,000, the French closed in. Under fire from the British fleet, the French advanced against the final British position led by a battalion of 300 men of combined grenadier companies in a bayonet charge commanded by the Marquis de Cussi and Comte de Montaigu. The rear guard under Dury attempted a counter-attack in which he was fatally wounded and the 1st Foot Guards and line grenadiers broke and fled into the sea with 800 killed and over 700 taken prisoner. The French infantry pursued the stragglers into waist-deep water until the fleet ceased fire, at which point they attended to the British wounded, having suffered about 300 casualties themselves.

Aftermath
While the British continued such expeditions against French colonies and islands beyond the reach of the French land forces, this was the last attempt by an amphibious expedition in force against the coast of France during the Seven Years' War. The fiasco of the embarcation from Saint-Cast helped convince British Prime Minister Pitt to send instead military aid and troops to fight alongside Ferdinand and Frederick the Great on the continent of Europe. The negative potential for another disaster and expense of expeditions this size was considered to outweigh the temporary gain of the raids.

The French had this to say about their own performance:

"Si les Bretons s'étaient couverts de gloire, le petit Duc (d'Aiguillon) s'était couvert de farine." (If the Bretons were covered with glory, the little duke was covered with flour.) This refers to the location of the headquarters at the mill of Moulin d'Anne, where it is rumoured that the duke was entertained by the miller.

See also
 Great Britain in the Seven Years' War
 France in the Seven Years' War

Notes

References

Further reading
 A soldier's journal containing a particular description of the several descents  on the coast of France last war; with an entertaining account of the islands of Guadaloupe Dominique, &c. and also of the isles of Wight and Jersey.  To which are annexed, Observations on the present state of the army of Great Britain., London, Printed for E. and C. Dilly, 1770. First hand account written by a private of the 68th Foot.
 A genuine narrative of the enterprise against the stores and shipping at St. Maloes, from the letters of a person of distinction in the service ...  London, Printed for J. Staples, 1758.
 An Authentic Account of our last attempt on the Coast of France by an Officer who miraculously escaped being cut to pieces, by Swimming to a Boat at a considerable distance from the shore., London, 1758. Containing two first hand accounts of the battle.
 An Impartial Narrative of the Last Expedition to the Coast of France by an Eyewitness. London, 1758.
 Revue anglo-française, Tome Quatrième, Poitiers, 1836.
 Crucible of War, Anderson, Fred. New York, 2000, p. 303. .
 History of England, The Revolution, Death of George the Second. Designed as a Continuation of Mr, Hume's History. T, Smollett,M.D. Vol.III, London, 1848.
 Origin and services of the Coldstream Guards, Daniel Mackinnon. London 1883, Vol.I.
 Origin and History of the First or Grenadier Guards, Lieutenant-General F.W.Hamilton, London, 1874, Vol. II.
 Naval and Military Memoirs of Great Britain, from 1727 to 1783, Vol II and Vol. III, Appendix, London, 1804, Robert Beatson.
 A History of the British Army, Fortescue J. W., MacMillan, London, 1899, Vol. II.
 The Seven Years War, Daniel Marsten, Osprey, Oxford, 2001, 
 The Military Experience in the Age of Reason, Duffy, Christopher, 1998, Wordsworth Editions Ltd., Hertfordshire, 
 History of the Royal Regiment of Artillery, Duncan, Major Francis, London, 1879, Vol. 1.
 The Life of George, Lord Anson, Barrow, Sir John, London, 1889.

External links
  French Fleur-De-Lis:Prior to the French Revolution, there was no national flag which represented France. A variety of flags were used by troops, different types of ships and for other purposes. From 1590 to 1790 this flag is one of four that was used on warships and fortresses.
  French Fleur-De-Lis:This flag and this design with the coat of arms of France in the center are most commonly associated with ceremonial occasions from 1590 to 1790.
 :on the reverse of this plate it says: "Le pavillon royal était véritablement le drapeau national au dix-huitième siecle...Vue du chateau d'arrière d'un vaisseau de guerre de haut rang portant le pavillon royal (blanc, avec les armes de France)."
 : reverse of Flag plate in New York Public Library.

Battle of Saint Cast
Battles of the Seven Years' War
Battles involving France
Battles involving Great Britain
History of the French Navy
History of the Royal Navy
1758 in France
1758 in Great Britain